West Kootenay Transit System (formerly known as Kootenay Boundary Transit System) is the public transit system in Trail, Castlegar, Nelson, British Columbia and surrounding area. The transit services are operated from Trail, Castlegar, Nelson and serve Rossland, Warfield, Genelle, Montrose, Fruitvale, Salmo, Kaslo, Creston, Nakusp. Funding is provided under a partnership between the Regional District of Kootenay Boundary, Regional District of Central Kootenay and BC Transit. handyDART provides door-to-door transportation for people whose disability prevents them from using conventional bus service.

West Kootenay Transit System introduced a transit run between the Cities of Trail, Castlegar and Nelson, mainly to serve those travelling to Selkirk College's Castlegar Campus. This run is operational between the months of September and June and can be used for general transportation between the communities of Trail, Castlegar and Nelson.

Routes
The transit system has three zones (Columbia, Kootenay and Slocan) and over 30 routes serving the region of Regional District of Kootenay Boundary, including a connecting bus service to Castlegar, Nelson, Nakusp and Kaslo, in the adjoining Regional District of Central Kootenay.

Regional Connectors

Kootenay Zone
1 Uphill
2 Fairview
3 Rosemont
4 Nelson Airport
10 North Shore
14 Blewett
99 Kootenay Connector

Slocan Zone
20 Slocan Valley

Columbia Zone (Castlegar and Area)
31 North Castlegar
32 Columbia
33 Selkirk
34 Kinnaird
36 Ootischenia
38 Playmor

Columbia Zone (Trail and Area)
41 Binns
42 Columbia Heights
43 Glenmerry/Fruitvale
44 Sunningdale
45 Teck
46 Rossland
47 Tadanac
48 Red Mountain Ski Bus

Nakusp and Kaslo Local Paratransit
51 Nakusp – Hot Springs
52 Nakusp – New Denver – Silverton
53 Nakusp – Edgewood
57 Kaslo Local
58 Kaslo – Argenta

Health Connections
72 Salmo – Nelson
74 Nakusp – Nelson
76 Kaslo – Nelson

See also

 Public transport in Canada

References

Transit agencies in British Columbia
Nelson, British Columbia